Neukirchen am Großvenediger is a market town in the district of Zell am See (Pinzgau region), in the state of Salzburg in Austria. Neukirchen is at an altitude of 856 meters and its population (as of May 2001) is 2,616.

References

Externan links

Cities and towns in Zell am See District
Kitzbühel Alps
Venediger Group